Michael John Maher  (11 July 1936 – 29 September 2013) was an Australian politician. Born in Sydney, he attended De La Salle College Ashfield and the University of Sydney and became a solicitor. A member of the Labor Party, he was elected to the New South Wales Legislative Assembly at the 1973 election, representing the seat of Drummoyne. He held Drummoyne until resigning to contest the 1982 Lowe by-election, caused by the resignation of former Liberal Prime Minister William McMahon. Maher was successful, and held the seat until 1987, when he was defeated by Bob Woods. Michael Maher was described in 2000 by a subsequent ALP Member for Lowe, John Murphy, as 'one of the most genuine and most loved members to grace this House'.

In 2000, Maher was honoured with the Medal of the Order of Australia for service to parliament at state and federal levels, and to the Maltese community of New South Wales.

References

 

Australian Labor Party members of the Parliament of Australia
Members of the Australian House of Representatives for Lowe
Members of the Australian House of Representatives
Members of the New South Wales Legislative Assembly
Recipients of the Medal of the Order of Australia
1936 births
2013 deaths
20th-century Australian politicians